Alexander Kelly House, also known as the John B. Kelly House, is a historic plantation house located near Carthage, Moore County, North Carolina. It was built in 1842, and is a two-story, five bay, double pile, Federal / Greek Revival style frame dwelling.  The house rests on tapered, hewn brownstone piers and has a deep hip roof.  The front facade features a three-bay pedimented porch.

It was added to the National Register of Historic Places in 2002.

References

Plantation houses in North Carolina
Houses on the National Register of Historic Places in North Carolina
Houses completed in 1842
Federal architecture in North Carolina
Greek Revival houses in North Carolina
Houses in Moore County, North Carolina
National Register of Historic Places in Moore County, North Carolina
1842 establishments in North Carolina